Bad law may be considered to include unsound interpretation of legal principles, or a proposition of law that is erroneous, or an attempted statement of the law that is inaccurate, or non-law.

Walker Marshall said that bad law is in many instances nothing else than bad logic.

Case law
The following may be considered bad law:
A precedent that has been overruled
A judicial decision that is no law at all
A judicial decision that was "wrongly decided"
A judicial decision that was made per incuriam

A case may be reckoned bad law for some years but never actually overruled. Fitzroy v Gwillim and Corbett v Poelnitz are examples of such cases.

The Roberts' Doctrine implied that the Supreme Court of the United States could follow a decision that was bad law in certain circumstances. This doctrine was established by the decision in West Coast Hotel Co. v. Parrish (1937), and abolished by the decision in Erie Railroad Co. v. Tompkins (1938).

Wrongly decided
Edwin Bell said: An advocate may have to argue that a decision which is a direct authority against him, although it has been accepted as law and followed in numerous cases, was wrongly decided and is what lawyers call "bad law", and should be overruled.

The case of Mills v Armstrong is an instance in which a previous decision in Thorogood v Bryan was overruled on the ground that the decision was opposed to principles of justice. In Thorogood v Bryan the personal representatives of a deceased person brought an action against the owner of an omnibus by which the deceased was run over and killed. The omnibus in which the deceased had been carried had set him down in the middle of the road, instead of drawing up to the curb; and before he could get out of the way he was run over by the defendant's omnibus, which was coming along at too rapid a pace to be able to pull up. Both drivers were found guilty of negligence, but it was held that the plaintiff was not entitled to recover, on the principle that a passenger identifies himself with the conveyance in which he is travelling, and if the driver is guilty of negligence, his fault is imputed to the passenger.

In Mills v Armstrong, a collision occurred between the steamship Bernina and the Steamship Bushire, the result of which was that Armstrong, the first engineer of the Bushire was drowned. The collision was caused by the negligence of those in charge of both ships, and the action was brought by the personal representatives of Armstrong against the owner of The Bernina to recover damages for his death. It was argued that the plaintiff could not recover on the principle laid down in Thorogood v Bryan. But it was held by the House of Lords that the case of Thorogood v Bryan was wrongly decided, and the principle of it was overruled.

Erroneous
In Butler v Van Wyck (1841), Bronson J, dissenting, said:

In Bradshaw v Duluth Imperial Mill Co (1892), Mitchell J said:

In 1860, Walker Marshall said:

"Bad Ellenborough law"
As to the suppression of the publication of bad law by law reporters: Lord Campbell said:

Lord Campbell's reference to bad law was a reference to wrongly decided cases. Robert Deal said that because the "bad Ellenborough law" is no longer extant, it is not possible to be certain that it actually was bad. The Law Journal said that Campbell's drawer for Lord Ellenborough's bad law was probably opened rather too arrogantly.

The Law Quarterly Review said of the Year Book report at 30 & 31 Edw 1 Br Chr 30, i 506: "Brave reporter! This is better than surreptitiously keeping a drawer like Campbell for Ellenborough's bad law."

Error of law
In Edwards v Bairstowe (1956), Lord Radcliffe said "If the case contains anything ex facie which is bad law and which bears upon the determination, it is obviously erroneous in point of law."

See also
Bad law makes hard cases, a maxim
Dumb laws, those laws which are particularly bizarre

References
James Oldham. "Bad law" in "The indispensibility of nanuscript case notes to eighteenth-century barristers and judges". Musson and Stebbings (eds). Making Legal History. Cambridge University Press. 2012. Page 30 at pages 49 and 50.

Legal concepts